Deborah Beth Goldberg (born May 11, 1954) is an American politician and lawyer. She is the Treasurer of Massachusetts, serving since January 2015. She was a member of the Board of Selectmen for the town of Brookline, Massachusetts from 1998 to 2004, serving the last two terms as chair. Goldberg was a candidate in the 2006 Massachusetts Democratic primary election for lieutenant governor. In 2018, Goldberg was re-elected as State Treasurer.

Early life and education
Goldberg was raised in Brookline and graduated from Boston University (B.A., '75), Boston College Law School (J.D., '83), and Harvard Business School (M.B.A., '85).

Goldberg's family immigrated to Massachusetts and opened a grocery store in Boston's North End in 1892. The family opened additional stores and their business grew into what eventually became Stop & Shop, the largest supermarket chain in New England. Goldberg helped run this family business when she was younger and attributes some of her stance on advocating for local issues to her upbringing with a family-run market. She relates to her constituents with rhetoric such as "I say my family is your family" in her speeches. Though she received an MBA, she states “my real MBA came from working in the business.”

Political career

2006 lieutenant governor campaign

In the 2006 Democratic Primary, Goldberg finished second in a three-way race to then-Worcester Mayor Tim Murray with 33% of the vote.

She received the endorsement of the Boston Herald, but failed to win the endorsement of her hometown newspaper, the Brookline Tab, because, they claimed, she had "been taking too much credit" for the town's accomplishments and had "over inflate(d) the chairman's job". The strongly worded rebuke resulted in a vocal reader response and a separate endorsement from Stan Spiegel, a Brookline Tab columnist and Brookline Town Meeting member.

2014 campaign for treasurer

On February 27, 2014, Goldberg formally announced her candidacy for State Treasurer. At the Massachusetts Democratic Convention, she was the top vote-getter in the race for Treasurer, winning 38.9% of the vote. Goldberg was the first to release a televised advertisement in the race on August 4, 2014. Goldberg was seated as Treasurer January 21, 2015 after defeating Republican Mike Heffernan in the general election.

2018 re-election

In 2018, Goldberg was re-elected for her position as State Treasurer.

Other work
Prior to becoming Treasurer, Goldberg served as president of the board of directors of Adoptions with Love, was an Advisory Board member of the Greater Boston Food Bank, is a Commissioner on the Town of Brookline's Neighborhood Conservation District Commission, was Senate President Therese Murray's appointee to the Treasurer's Commonwealth Covenant Fund, and sat on the advisory board of the Taubman Center for State and Local Government at Harvard Kennedy School.

Goldberg is involved with various events for Jewish organizations such as the Jewish Alliance for Law and Social Action and was the first Jewish woman elected to statewide office in Massachusetts. She received the 2016 Excellence in Leadership Award from The Jewish Community Relations Council of Greater Boston (JCRC) and the Massachusetts Association of Jewish Federations (MAJF)'s "Women in Leadership" reception.

Controversy
In November 2014, it was reported that Goldberg had admonished an employee of Adoptions with Love for seeking employment with the State Treasurer's office without first informing her current employer of her job seeking plans. Goldberg came to this knowledge in her official capacity as Treasurer-elect, and her actions were seen as a breach of ethics.

Electoral history

Personal life
She is married to Michael Winter, with whom she has two children.

References

Further reading
 Supporting state treasurer candidate Goldberg
 Candidate for Mass. treasurer Deb Goldberg endorsed by labor union representing 35K members
 Treasurer candidate Deb Goldberg gets firefighter support
 Emily's List Endorses Deb Goldberg for Massachusetts Treasurer
 Democratic primary likely in Massachusetts treasurer's race

External links

 Government website
 Deb Goldberg for Treasurer campaign website

1954 births
21st-century American politicians
21st-century American women politicians
Boston College Law School alumni
Boston University alumni
Harvard Business School alumni
Jewish American people in Massachusetts politics
Jewish women politicians
Living people
Massachusetts Democrats
Politicians from Brookline, Massachusetts
State treasurers of Massachusetts
Women in Massachusetts politics
21st-century American Jews